Savelli may refer to:

Savelli family
Savelli (surname)
Savelli, Calabria, a comune and town in southern Italy
PalaSavelli, an indoor sporting arena in Porto San Giorgio, Italy